Paranitocris luci is a species of beetle in the family Cerambycidae. It was described by Lepesme and Stephan von Breuning in 1955.

References

Saperdini
Beetles described in 1955